Prunaru may refer to several villages in Romania:

 Prunaru, a village in Prunișor Commune, Mehedinți County
 Prunaru, a village in Bujoreni Commune, Teleorman County